Ivana Kubešová (née Kleinová, then Walterová; born 26 May 1962 in Šumperk) is a retired middle distance runner who represented Czechoslovakia and later the Czech Republic. She won three medals at the European Indoor Championships as well as a silver medal at the 1991 IAAF World Indoor Championships.

International competitions

References

1962 births
Living people
Czech female middle-distance runners
Czechoslovak female middle-distance runners
European Athletics Championships medalists
People from Šumperk
World Athletics Championships athletes for Czechoslovakia
Sportspeople from the Olomouc Region